Addictive Behaviors is a monthly peer-reviewed scientific journal published by Elsevier. It was established in 1975 by Peter M. Miller (Medical University of South Carolina), who remained at the helm of the journal until December 2017. The current editor-in-chief is Marcantonio M. Spada (London South Bank University), who took over from Miller in January 2018. The journal covers behavioral and psychosocial research concerning addictive behaviors in its widest sense.

Abstracting and indexing
The journal is abstracted and indexed in:

According to the Journal Citation Reports, the journal has a 2021 impact factor of 4.591.

References

External links

Elsevier academic journals
Addiction medicine journals
Publications established in 1975
English-language journals
Monthly journals